The 2009 Men's Hockey Hamburg Masters was the fifteenth edition of the Hamburg Masters, consisting of a series of test matches. It was held in Hamburg, Germany, from 4–7 June 2009, and featured four of the top nations in men's field hockey.

Competition format
The tournament featured the national teams of Australia, England, the Netherlands, and the hosts, Germany, competing in a round-robin format, with each team playing each other once. Three points were awarded for a win, one for a draw, and none for a loss.

Officials
The following umpires were appointed by the International Hockey Federation to officiate the tournament:

 Christian Bläsch (GER)
 Henrik Ehlers (AUT)
 Gijs Hofman (NED)
 Andrew Kennedy (ENG)
 Scott O'Brien (AUS)

Results
All times are local (Central European Summer Time).

Pool

Fixtures

Statistics

Final standings

Goalscorers

References

External links
Deutscher Hockey-Bund

2009
Men's
2009 in Australian sport
2009 in Dutch sport
2009 in English sport
2009 in German sport
Sport in Hamburg
June 2009 sports events in Europe